Vitaly Shulakov (born May 9, 1983 in Angarsk) is a Russian professional ice hockey defenceman who currently plays for Olimp Riga in the Latvian Hockey League (LHL). He last played in the  Kontinental Hockey League (KHL) with the now VHL club, HC Yugra. He first played in the top Russian tier with Amur Khabarovsk in 2004.

References

External links

1983 births
Living people
People from Angarsk
Amur Khabarovsk players
HC Lada Togliatti players
HC Neftekhimik Nizhnekamsk players
Salavat Yulaev Ufa players
HC Spartak Moscow players
HC Yugra players
Russian ice hockey defencemen
Sportspeople from Irkutsk Oblast